Roma Wagner (born 21 July 1912, date of death unknown) was an Austrian backstroke and freestyle swimmer. She competed in two events at the 1936 Summer Olympics. Wagner was in the women's 4 × 100 metre freestyle relay with Grete Ittlinger, Franziska Mally and Elli von Kropiwnicki and they failed to make the first three, and the finals, by coming last in the first semi-final.

References

External links
 

1912 births
Year of death missing
Austrian female backstroke swimmers
Olympic swimmers of Austria
Swimmers at the 1936 Summer Olympics
Place of birth missing
Austrian female freestyle swimmers